Thomas Wimmer (Vienna) is an Austrian viola-da-gamba player and conductor of Accentus Austria.

References

Austrian male musicians
Living people
Year of birth missing (living people)
Place of birth missing (living people)